Jump off Joe is a butte in the Horse Heaven Hills south of Kennewick in the U.S. state of Washington. Jump off Joe rises above the Tri-Cities and is visible throughout much of the region, including in parts of Umatilla and Morrow Counties in Oregon to the south. A gravel road approaches the summit from the south up a steep incline. On a clear day, visitors to the summit can see Mount Hood, Mount Adams and Mount Rainier.

Jump off Joe's high elevation compared to the surrounding area makes it an ideal location to place towers for radio and television communications. Among these is an amateur radio repeater that provides coverage to much of the Columbia Basin. Two major local television stations, NBC affiliate KNDU and ABC affiliate KVEW have their towers atop the butte. FM radio stations with transmitters on top of the butte include KUJ-FM and KORD-FM.

Geology
Jump off Joe and the greater Horse Heaven Hills are anticlines within the Yakima Fold Belt. The belt is a series of fault lines extending throughout south-central Washington which are part of the larger Olympic–Wallowa Lineament. The lineament runs from Port Angeles to the Wallowa Mountains in northeastern Oregon.

Rocks in the area are predominantly basalt, part of the Columbia River Basalt Group. Lava flows believed to have originated from the Yellowstone hotspot approximately 10 to 15 million years ago when the hotspot was located in western Idaho.

During the Last Glacial Maximum, ice sheets extended into what is today the Idaho Panhandle, blocking the flow of the Clark Fork River creating Glacial Lake Missoula. Over a period of 2,000 years the weight of the water behind this ice dam caused it to break sending a surge of water toward the Pacific Ocean. This water would back up at the Horse Heaven Hills, flowing through and deepening Wallula Gap located a few miles southeast.

Climate and ecology
Jump off Joe lies in a semi-arid environment within the rain shadow of the Cascade Mountains. High winds in the area provide an excellent setting for wind turbines to generate power. Like most of the Mid Columbia, the butte is treeless. Plant life includes native grasses and sagebrush.

Afternoon temperatures in the summer can exceed . Jump off Joe frequently lies above inversions that form in the Columbia Basin during high pressure systems in the winter months.

See also
Badger Mountain (Benton County, Washington)
Wallula Gap
Rattlesnake Mountain (Benton County, Washington)

References

Horse Heaven Hills
Mountains of Benton County, Washington
Tri-Cities, Washington
Mountains of Washington (state)